is a railway station on the Nagaragawa Railway Etsumi-Nan Line in the city of Gujō, Gifu Prefecture, Japan, operated by the third-sector railway operator Nagaragawa Railway.

Lines

Station layout
Aioi Station has one ground-level side platform serving a single bi-directional track. The station is unattended.

Adjacent stations

History
Operations were transferred from the Japanese National Railways (JNR) to the Nagaragawa Railway on December 11, 1986.

Surrounding area
 Aioi Post Office

]

See also
 List of Railway Stations in Japan

References

External links

 

Railway stations in Japan opened in 1929
Railway stations in Gifu Prefecture
Stations of Nagaragawa Railway
Gujō, Gifu